Aung Kyaw Soe (born 18 September 1968) is a Burmese politician currently serving as a House of Nationalities MP for  Kayah State No. 7 constituency.

Early life and education
He was born on 18 September 1968 in Loikaw, Kayah State, Burma (Myanmar).

Political career
He is a member of the National League for Democracy. In the Myanmar general election, 2015, he was elected as an Amyotha Hluttaw MP, winning a majority of 1431 votes and elected representative from Kayah State No. 7 parliamentary constituency.

References

National League for Democracy politicians
1968 births
Living people
People from Kayah State